Antonio Tauler Llull (born 11 April 1974) is a Spanish professional racing cyclist from Santa Margalida.

Major results

 1996
 1st, Vuelta a Cartagena
 1998
 2nd, Stage 5, Vuelta a Murcia
 1998 World Cup
 3rd, Pursuit, Berlin
 1999
 1st, Stage 5, Vuelta a Murcia
 2000
 3rd, Stage 1, Volta a la Comunitat Valenciana
 2001
 2nd, Individual time trial, National Road Championships
 2002
 2nd, Individual time trial, National Road Championships
 3rd, Memorial Manuel Galera
 2003
 2nd, Individual time trial, National Road Championships
 2006
 2nd, Pursuit, National Track Championships
 1st, Individual time trial, National Road Championships
 2007
 National Track Championships
 2nd, Pursuit
 3rd, Team Pursuit
 3rd, Madison
 2007–2008 World Cup
 2nd, Points race, Sydney

External links 
 

Spanish male cyclists
Spanish track cyclists
1974 births
Living people
Cyclists at the 2000 Summer Olympics
Cyclists at the 2008 Summer Olympics
Olympic cyclists of Spain
Olympic silver medalists for Spain
Olympic medalists in cycling
Sportspeople from Mallorca
Medalists at the 2008 Summer Olympics
Cyclists from the Balearic Islands